Gavrilovo-Posadsky District is an administrative and municipal district (raion), one of the twenty-one in Ivanovo Oblast, Russia. It is located in the southwest of the oblast. Its administrative center is the town of Gavrilov Posad. Population:   20,430 (2002 Census);  The population of Gavrilov Posad accounts for 42.9% of the district's total population.

Administrative and municipal status
The town of Gavrilov Posad serves as the administrative center of the district. Prior to the adoption of the Law #145-OZ On the Administrative-Territorial Division of Ivanovo Oblast in December 2010, it was administratively incorporated separately from the district. Municipally, Gavrilov Posad is incorporated within Gavrilovo-Posadsky Municipal District as Gavrilovo-Posadskoye Urban Settlement.

References

Notes

Sources

Districts of Ivanovo Oblast
